Vittorio Tamagnini (10 February 1910 – 20 January 1981) was a  bantamweight professional boxer from Italy, who won the gold medal at the 1928 Summer Olympics in Amsterdam, Netherlands.

Olympic results 
Round of 32: bye
Round of 16: Defeated Fidel Ortiz (Mexico) points
Quarterfinal: Defeated Jack Garland (Great Britain) points
Semifinal: Defeated Frank Traynor (Ireland) points
Final: Defeated John Daley (United States) points (won gold medal)

References

External links
 

1910 births
1981 deaths
Olympic boxers of Italy
Bantamweight boxers
People from Civitavecchia
Olympic gold medalists for Italy
Boxers at the 1928 Summer Olympics
Olympic medalists in boxing
Italian male boxers
Medalists at the 1928 Summer Olympics
Sportspeople from the Metropolitan City of Rome Capital